The Two of Us (originally Thina Sobabili: The Two of Us) is a 2014 drama film produced, written and directed by Ernest Nkosi. Set in Alexandra, Johannesburg the film tells a story of tough choices made by the youth living in the township neighborhood.

Independently funded by The Monarchy Group over a four-year period and filmed in a week, The Two of Us won the Audience Award at the 2015 Pan African Film Festival and won the same award seven days later at the Jozi Film Festival. On the weekend of its theatrical release, it won the Silverback Best Feature Film at the Rwanda Film Festival whilst ranking 8th as the only non-studio film in the top 10 at the South African box office.

The film was selected as the South African entry for the Best Foreign Language Film at the 88th Academy Awards but it was not nominated.

Cast 
 Emmanuel Nkosinathi Gweva as Thulani
 Busisiwe Mtshali as Zanele
 Richard Lukunku as Skhalo
 Zikhona Sodlaka as Zoleka
 Mpho "Popps" Modikoane as Mandla
 Thato Dhladla as Sbu
 Thembi Nyandeni as Gogo
 Hazel Mhlaba as Tumi
 Kope Makgae as Mr Finance

Film Festival Awards  
 The Pan African Film Festival 2015 - Audience Award
 Jozi Film Festival 2015 - Audience Award
 Rwanda Film Festival 2015 - Silverback Best Feature Film

See also
 List of submissions to the 88th Academy Awards for Best Foreign Language Film
 List of South African submissions for the Academy Award for Best Foreign Language Film

References

External links
 Official website
 
 Thina Sobabili: The Two of Us on Facebook
 The Two of Us on Twitter
 Thina Sobabili: The Two of Us on Vimeo
 EPK Part 1 
 EPK Part 2

2014 films
Zulu-language films
Films set in South Africa
South African drama films